The Mampuri Wind Farms (also known as the Senok Wind Farms, after its developers) are a set of three wind farms located near the Lakvijaya Power Station, on the Kalpitiya peninsula, in Mampuri, Puttalam District, Sri Lanka. Mampuri-I was commissioned on 22 March 2010, and was the first wind farm in the country to reach the  installed capacity threshold.

Mampuri-I 
Per the government's standardized power purchase agreement, the Ceylon Electricity Board pays Senok  for every kilowatt hour generated for the first eight years, followed by an adjusted rate thereafter. This phase created 40 jobs in the region, and cost  to build. 55% of this was directly funded by Senok, with the remainder was funded by the World Bank.

Mampuri-II and Mampuri-III 
Mampuri-II and Mampuri-III were constructed almost simultaneously after Mampuri-I. These wind farms utilizes five  wind turbines each.

See also 

 Electricity in Sri Lanka
 List of power stations in Sri Lanka

References 

Wind farms in Sri Lanka
Buildings and structures in Puttalam District